Wormley-Hoddesdonpark Wood North is a  woodland area in Hertfordshire which has been designated as a biological site of Special Scientific Interest. The site is listed as Grade 1 in A Nature Conservation Review, and is also designated a Special Area of Conservation. It is in Hoddesdon in the borough of Broxbourne, but part of the site is in East Hertfordshire.

It includes Hoddesdonpark Wood and Broxbourne Wood, which are part of Broxbourne Woods National Nature Reserve. Broxbourne Wood is owned by the Woodland Trust. The site also includes Danemead, a small area of 5.6 hectares, which is managed by the Herts and Middlesex Wildlife Trust.

See also
List of Sites of Special Scientific Interest in Hertfordshire

References

Sites of Special Scientific Interest in Hertfordshire
Sites of Special Scientific Interest notified in 1985
East Hertfordshire District
Nature Conservation Review sites
Forests and woodlands of Hertfordshire